Yours Truly is the eighth studio album by American country music artist Earl Thomas Conley. It was released on July 9, 1991 by RCA Records. It was Conley's final album for RCA and his final to chart (it peaked at No. 53 on the country albums chart in the US). "Shadow of a Doubt" was the first single released from the album and went to No. 8 on the Billboard Hot Country Singles chart on August 23, 1991. The second release, "Brotherly Love" peaked at No. 2 on the country singles chart on November 15, 1991.

Critical reception

Thom Owens of AllMusic writes, "Yours Truly is one of Earl Thomas Conley's finest efforts, boasting a consistently impressive set of songs and wonderful vocals from Conley."

Jonathan Pappalardo of My Kind of Country grades this album and "A" and concludes his article with, "Yours Truly is an excellent album, which to my ears, has aged remarkably well. I love seeing artists with a somewhat updated sound and Conley shines here. “Brotherly Love” is the standout track and well deserved big hit. Go to YouTube and stream everything else. You won't be disappointed."

Track listing

Track information and credits adapted from the album's liner notes.

Personnel
Adapted from liner notes.

Tracks 1, 3-5, 10
Richard Bennett - acoustic guitar, electric guitar
Robert Byrne - background vocals (tracks 1, 3)
Larry Byrom - acoustic guitar, electric guitar, slide acoustic guitar, background vocals (track 10)
Earl Thomas Conley - lead vocals 
Bill Cuomo - keyboards
Jerry Douglas - dobro (track 5)
Jimmie Fadden - harmonica (track 5)
David Hungate - bass guitar
Bernie Leadon - banjo, mandolin
Larry Michael Lee - background vocals (track 10)
Josh Leo - acoustic guitar, electric guitar
Carl Marsh - keyboards
Jim Photoglo - background vocals (tracks 4, 5)
Russell Smith - background vocals (tracks 4, 5)
Harry Stinson - drums, background vocals (track 10)
Biff Watson - acoustic guitar

Track 2
Eddie Bayers - drums
Sam Bush - mandolin
Earl Thomas Conley - lead vocals
Paul Franklin - pedal steel guitar
Rob Hajacos - fiddle
Mac McAnally - acoustic guitar
Brent Mason - electric guitar
Dave Pomeroy - upright bass
Matt Rollings - piano
Keith Whitley - duet vocals

Tracks 6-9
Michael Black - background vocals
Earl Thomas Conley - lead vocals
Glen Duncan - fiddle
Steve Gibson - acoustic guitar, electric guitar
Paul Franklin - pedal steel guitar, acoustic lap steel guitar, dobro
Mitch Humphries - keyboards
David Hungate - bass guitar
Paul Leim - drums
Brent Rowan - electric guitar
Dennis Wilson - background vocals
Curtis Young - background vocals

Charts

Album

Singles

References

External links
RCA Records Official Site

1991 albums
Earl Thomas Conley albums